The Capt. Larned House is a historic house on Arkansas Highway 157, near its junction with Moss Drive north of Judsonia, Arkansas.  It is a two-story L-shaped wood-frame structure, with a gabled roof, weatherboard siding, and a foundation of stone, concrete, and brick piers.  It is a vernacular expression of Queen Anne styling, with turned posts and scrolled brackets on its porches.  Built about 1905, it is one of the Judsonia area's finer examples of the style.

The house was listed on the National Register of Historic Places in 1992.

See also
National Register of Historic Places listings in White County, Arkansas

References

Houses on the National Register of Historic Places in Arkansas
Queen Anne architecture in Arkansas
Houses completed in 1905
Houses in White County, Arkansas
National Register of Historic Places in White County, Arkansas
Judsonia, Arkansas
1905 establishments in Arkansas
Victorian architecture in Arkansas
Folk Victorian architecture in the United States